was a Japanese actor. He played Mitsuhiro Ide in Ultraman, having won the role when originally cast actor Susumu Ishikawa left the production.

Death
Masanari Nihei died on 21 August 2021 due to aspiration pneumonia. His funeral was held privately by his close relatives.

Selected filmography

Film

 Kane-dukuri taikô-ki (1960)
 Ankokugai no dankon (1961)
 Nasake muyo no wana (1961)
 As a Wife, As a Woman (1961)
 Nakito gozansu (1961)
 Mothra (1961) - Dam Policeman / Infant Island Islander (uncredited)
 Witness Killed (1961)
 Gorath (1962) - Itô - Astronaut of Ôtori
 Dobunezumi sakusen (1962)
 Nihon ichi no wakadaishô (1962)
 Gekkyû dorobo (1962)
 Sengoku yarô (1963)
 Chintao yôsai bakugeki meirei (1963)
 Ichi ka bachi ka (1963)
 Ringo no hana saku machi (1963) - Takuya Igarashi
 The Lost World of Sinbad (1963) - Rebel
 Eburi manshi no yûga-na seikatsu (1963)
 Kyô mo ware ôzora ni ari (1964)
 Aa bakudan (1964) - Tatsumi
 Nippon ichi no horafuki otoko (1964) - Construction Worker
 Kokusai himitsu keisatsu: Kayaku no taru (1964) - Seinen Miyaji
 Hana no oedo no musekinin (1964)
 Samurai Assassin (1965) - Ronin
 Nippon ichi no goma suri otoko (1965)
 Taiheiyô kiseki no sakusen: Kisuka (1965)
 Senjo ni nagareru uta (1965)
 Kureji no daiboken (1965)
 Ereki no Wakadaishō (1965) - Nishina / The Drummer of The Young Beats
 Onna no naka ni iru tanin (1966)
 Nippon ichi no gorigan otoko (1966)
 Kureji da yo: kisôtengai (1966) - Yokota
 Kureji daisakusen (1966)
 The Age of Assassins (1967) - Pappy
 Ultraman (1968) - Mitsuhiro Ide
 Nippon ichi no danzetsu otoko (1969)
 Kiki kaikai ore wa dareda?! (1969) - Henchman
 Hangyaku no Melody (1970)
 Dodesukaden (1970) - 4th Man calling out
 Nippon ichi no warunori otoko (1970)
 Nippon ichi no shokku otoko (1971)
 A Man′s World (1971) - Aoki
 Nippon sanjûshi: Osaraba Tokyo no maki (1972) - Gen-san
 Isoge! Wakamono (1974) - Matsuo
 Shirauo (1977)
 Kochira Katsushika-ku Kameari kôen mae hashutsujo (1977)
 Hakunetsu Dead Heat (1977)
 Dainamaito don don (1978) - Inukai
 Ultraman: Great Monster Decisive Battle (1979) - Mitsuhiro Ide
 Ultraman (1979) - Mitsuhiro Ide
 Disciples of Hippocrates (1980) - Reporter
 Haithîn bugi (1982)
 Arashi o yobu otoko (1983) - Club manager
 Aitsu to lullaby (1983) - Takimoto
 Fireflies in the North (1984) - Tomosaburo Kumagai
 Usugeshô (1985)
 Ultraman Zearth (1996) - Photographer
 Revive! Ultraman (1996, Short) - Mitsuhiro Ide (archive footage)
 Ultraman Zearth 2 (1997) - Photographer
 Ultraman Cosmos: The First Contact (2001)
 Daikessen! Chô urutora 8 kyôdai (2008) - Owner of Cheep Candy Shop (final film role)

Television
 Ultra Q (1966; episodes 2, 6, and 15) - Nakamatsu's Assistant / Bank-Robber Gang Sato / The Man who Delivers Milk
 Ultraman (1966) - Mitsuhiro Ide
 Ultra Seven (1966, episode 42) - Masaya
 Mighty Jack (1968) - Akira Genda
 The Ultraman (1979-1980) - Hiroaki Tobe (voice)
 Tokkei Winspector (1990, episode 8) - Daizou Oomagari Gen'ichi Yonekura
 Sōrito Yobanaide (1997) - SP
 Ultraman Max (2006) - Dr. Date

References

External links

1940 births
2021 deaths
Japanese male film actors
Japanese male television actors
Male actors from Tokyo
Deaths from pneumonia in Japan